Eremolaena rotundifolia is a plant in the family Sarcolaenaceae. It is endemic to Madagascar. The specific epithet  is from the Latin meaning "round leaves".

Description
Eremolaena rotundifolia grows as a shrub or tree. The inflorescences bear a single flower.

Distribution and habitat
Eremolaena rotundifolia is known from the eastern regions of Sava, Atsimo-Atsinanana, Vatovavy-Fitovinany, Analanjirofo, Atsinanana and Anosy. Its habitat is humid coastal forest from sea-level to about  altitude. Some subpopulations are in protected areas.

References

Sarcolaenaceae
Endemic flora of Madagascar
Plants described in 1914
Flora of the Madagascar lowland forests